is a Japanese manga series written and illustrated by Rokuro Shinofusa. It was serialized in Shogakukan's Monthly Ikki from September 2003 to March 2007, with its chapters collected in eight tankōbon volumes.

Publication
Natsu no Kumo is written and illustrated by Rokuro Shinofusa. It was serialized in Shogakukan's Monthly Ikki from September 25, 2003 to March 24, 2007. Shogakukan collected its chapters in eight tankōbon volumes, released from May 28, 2004 to January 30, 2008.

In France, the manga was licensed by Soleil.

Volume list

References

Further reading

External links
  
 

Seinen manga
Shogakukan manga